Najas indica is a species of aquatic plant found in freshwater habitats, especially still or slow-moving waters, like ponds and rice fields. The flowers are monoecious.

Distribution
The natural distribution of this annual plant is India, China, Japan, Southeast Asia and New Guinea.

References

External links
Jepson Manual Treatment
Najas graminea

indica
Aquatic plants
Plants described in 1829
Flora of China
Flora of Japan
Flora of tropical Asia